The CS 44 is a Canadian sailboat, that was designed by Tony Castro.

Production
Only one CS 44 was completed and it was built by CS Yachts in Canada, in 1985.

Design
The CS 44 is a recreational keelboat, built predominantly of fibreglass, with Kevlar and a balsawood core. It has a masthead sloop rig, an internally-mounted spade-type rudder and a fixed fin keel. It displaces  and carries  of lead ballast.

The boat has a PHRF racing average handicap of 69 with a high of 69 and low of 69.

See also
List of sailing boat types

Similar sailboats
C&C 131

References

Keelboats
1980s sailboat type designs
Sailing yachts
Sailboat type designs by Tony Castro
Sailboat types built by CS Yachts